
Gmina Pleśna is a rural gmina (administrative district) in Tarnów County, Lesser Poland Voivodeship, in southern Poland.

Villages
Gmina Pleśna contains the villages and settlements of Dąbrówka Szczepanowska, Janowice, Lichwin, Łowczówek, Lubinka, Pleśna, Rychwałd, Rzuchowa, Świebodzin, Szczepanowice and Woźniczna.

Neighbouring gminas
Gmina Pleśna is bordered by the gminas of Gromnik, Tarnów, Tuchów, Wojnicz and Zakliczyn.

References
 Polish official population figures 2006

Plesna
Tarnów County